Market Street may refer to:
Market Street, Cambridge, England
Market Street, Fremantle, Western Australia, Australia
Market Street, George Town, Penang, Malaysia
Market Street, Manchester, England
Market Street, Melbourne, Victoria, Australia
Market Street, Oxford, England
Market Street (Philadelphia), Pennsylvania, US
Market Street (San Francisco), California, US
Market Street (St. Louis), Missouri, US
Market Street, Sydney, New South Wales, Australia
Market Street (York), England
State Street (Boston), former name

See also
United Supermarkets, a supermarket chain in Texas that contains a division called Market Street
Market Street Bridge (disambiguation)
Market Street Metrolink station, a Manchester light-rail station
Market Street Railway (nonprofit), organization that supports the operation of the F Market streetcar line in San Francisco
Market Street Railway (transit operator), commercial streetcar and bus operator in San Francisco
Market Street Subway in San Francisco, California
Market–Frankford Line, rapid transit line in Philadelphia, Pennsylvania
Market Street, a Lego building set in the Lego Modular Houses Theme series